Yvonne Belinda Rainsford (born 21 March 1983) is a former Zimbabwean woman cricketer. She is the sister of the Zimbabwean cricketer Ed Rainsford.

She was also the part of the Zimbabwean cricket team in its historical international debut in 2006. Rainsford made her ODI debut in the World Cup Pre-Qualifier in 2006 against Uganda. Yvonne played a crucial role in Zimbabwe's qualification to the Women's Cricket World Cup Qualifier in 2008. Zimbabwe was ranked on 5th in the 2008 Women's Cricket World Cup Qualifier.

References 

1983 births
Living people
Zimbabwean women cricketers
Sportspeople from Kadoma, Zimbabwe